Tyson Beckford (born December 19, 1970) is an American model and actor best known as a Ralph Lauren Polo model. He was also the host of both seasons of the Bravo program Make Me a Supermodel. Beckford has been described as one of the most successful black male supermodels of all time, achieving fame and huge contracts similar to the female models that had huge success in the 1990s.

Early life 
Beckford was born in Rochester New York, on December 19, 1970, to a Jamaican mother, Hillary Dixon Hall, and a Panamanian father of Jamaican and Chinese-Jamaican descent, Lloyd Beckford.

Soon after he was born, his mother took the family back to Jamaica, where they lived for seven years before moving to Rochester, New York, where he attended and graduated from Pittsford Mendon High School. During his school years, Tyson was often teased about his looks.

Career 
In 1992, "Erik Lauren Counsel" of the hip hop magazine The Source approached Beckford "in Washington Square Park" about being "in a style piece" in the magazine New York City. In an August 2021 VLADTV interview, Beckford clarified that nobody named Jeff Jones "discovered him" and said that "the person who gets the credit is Erik."

Confusion about his discovery might have happened after a 2005 People magazine interview, when Beckford stated that his career began as he was "minding his own business" in Manhattan's Washington Square Park, when scouts from the hip hop magazine The Source asked him to pose. "I'm thinkin', 'Yeah, this is some porno magazine,'" he recalled, "but everything was legit."
In 1993, Beckford was recruited by Ralph Lauren as the front model for the company's Polo line of male sportswear. 

Beckford was named "Man of the Year" in 1995 by the cable television music channel VH1 and one of the "50 Most Beautiful People in the World" by People magazine. He is represented by Soul Artist Management in New York City and D'management Group in Milan. He was ranked at No. 38 on VH1's 40 Hottest Hotties of the '90s.

In 2003, he appeared on the ABC network's celebrity reality game show I'm a Celebrity... Get Me Out of Here!. In September 2008, he supported the National RESPECT! Campaign against domestic violence, recording a voice message for the Giverespect.org Web site, speaking about the importance of respect for others.

Beckford co-hosted the modeling contest Make Me a Supermodel on the television channel Bravo with fellow supermodel Niki Taylor. The show chose Nicole Trunfio to join Beckford as a mentor to the model contestants for the show's second season. Other judges included designer Catherine Malandrino, model Jenny Shimizu, photographer Perou and model scout Marlon.

Beckford judged and mentored the contestants of the first few episodes of the Australian version of Make Me a Supermodel with model and former Miss Universe Jennifer Hawkins. In 2012, he participated in Fox's dating game show The Choice.

He was one of the judges on the British version of America's Next Top Model.

Personal life 
On Monday, June 6, 2005, Beckford was injured during a vehicle accident in Secaucus, New Jersey. "Shortly before 5:00 a.m., he lost control of his 2004 Dodge Ram SRT-10 and struck a utility pole. The vehicle caught fire immediately after the collision, but Beckford was able to pull himself out before the red pick-up became fully engulfed in flames." He was taken to the Jersey City Medical Center and hospitalized for head trauma and cuts.

During an interview on The Oprah Winfrey Show Tyson claimed the accident had a profound effect on his spirituality.

In the aforementioned Oprah interview, Tyson said, he was stopped at a stop sign on Route 3 in Secaucus, New Jersey, just outside of New York City, when he says his truck was rear-ended by a tractor-trailer. "I did a 180 spin and had my clutch foot in and my brake foot in. I was literally standing on top of it. I just hit the pole and wrapped the front end of my truck around it, and that was it." But that wasn't it.

"I remember hitting the steering wheel," Tyson says. "It felt like someone had taken a baseball bat and hit me on the [right] side of my face. I fell back into my seat and it was such a shock. I didn't know what happened and I wasn't moving. Then I figured, 'Okay, I'm dead.'

However, Detective Thomas O'Keeffe reportedly described the accident without mentioning a tractor-trailer, (as quoted previously): "Beckford, 34, lost control of his 2004 red Dodge Ram shortly before 5 a.m. Monday (June 6, 2005) and skidded into a pole. The truck caught fire, and Beckford was able to pull himself out before it became fully engulfed in flames."

Beckford has been a resident of the New Jersey communities of Edgewater and West New York.

Beckford has a son (born in 1998) from a previous relationship with celebrity stylist April Roomet, who appears on the E! Television program Candy Girls.
Beckford is an ambassador for the non-profit Kick 4 Life, an organization that uses the power of soccer to engage vulnerable youth in holistic care and support in Lesotho.

Filmography

Films

Television

Music videos

References

External links 

 
 
 
 Tyson Beckford at SKAM Artist

1970 births
Pittsford Mendon High School alumni
American people of Panamanian descent
American male film actors
People from Edgewater, New Jersey
People from West New York, New Jersey
American male actors of Chinese descent
American actors of Jamaican descent
American models of Chinese descent
Male actors from New Jersey
Male models from New Jersey
Participants in American reality television series
21st-century American male actors
Living people
People from the Bronx
Male models from New York (state)